Kuroishi Station is the name of two train stations in Japan.

 Kuroishi Station (Aomori) in Kuroishi, Aomori Prefecture
 Kuroishi Station (Kumamoto) in Kōshi, Kumamoto Prefecture